Wang Chen may refer to:

 Wang Chen (Three Kingdoms) (died 266), Cao Wei official
 Wang Chen (politician) (born 1950), People's Republic of China politician
 Wang Chen (physician) (born 1962), Chinese pulmonologist

Sportspeople
 Wang Chen (table tennis) (born 1974), Chinese female table tennis player representing the United States
 Wang Chen (badminton) (born 1976), Chinese female badminton player representing Hong Kong
 Wang Chen (figure skater) (born 1986), Chinese male ice dancer
 Wang Chen (volleyball) (born 1987), Chinese volleyball player
 Wang Chen (high jumper) (born 1990), Chinese high jumper

See also
 Wang Zhen (disambiguation), spelled Wang Chen in Wade–Giles